Friedrich von Lucanus  full name Friedrich Karl Hermann von Lucanus (20 June 1869, Berlin  - 18 February 1947, Buschow) was a German professional soldier (Oberstleutnant a.D.; Dr.h.c.)) ornithologist, ethologist and author of popular scientific animal books.

Das Leben der Vögel. A. Scherl, Berlin, 1925
Tier und Jagd. Berlin, 1926
Im Zauber des Tierlebens. Volksverband der Bücherfreunde, Wegweiser-Verlag, Berlin, 1926
Naturdenkmäler aus der deutschen Vogelwelt. H. Bermühler, Berlin-Lichterfelde, 1927
Die Rätsel des Vogelzuges. (1. Aufl. 1922.) 3., verm u. verb. Aufl., H. Beyer & Söhne, Langensalza, 1929
Zugvögel und Vogelzug. Julius Springer, Berlin, 1929
Deutschlands Vogelwelt. Parey, Berlin, 1937
He was President of the German Ornithologists' Society from 1921 to 1926 and a Corresponding 
Fellow of the American Ornithologists' Union.

German ornithologists